Hydrophis annandalei, commonly known as Annandale's sea snake or the bighead sea snake, is a species of venomous snake in the subfamily Hydrophiinae of the family Elapidae. The species, which is sometimes placed in its own genus Kolpophis, is native to parts of the Indian Ocean.

Etymology
The specific name, annandalei, is in honor of Scottish herpetologist Nelson Annandale.

Geographic range
H. annandalei is found in the Indian Ocean, in waters off Indonesia (Borneo, Java), western Malaysia, Singapore, Cambodia, Thailand, and southern Vietnam.

Habitat
The preferred natural habitats of H. annandalei are shallow muddy coastal waters.

Description
Its coloration, which consists of dark crossbands on a  bluish grey ground color dorsally, and which is uniform pale yellow or cream ventrally, is similar to that of other sea snakes. However, K. annandalei can be identified by its high number of dorsal scale rows, 74–93 at midbody.

Reproduction
H. annandalei is viviparous.

References

Further reading
Das I (1993). "Annandales's seasnake, Kolpophis annandalei (Laidlaw 1901): a new record for Borneo". Raffles Bulletin of Zoology 41: 359-361.
Laidlaw FF (1901). "List of a Collection of Snakes, Crocodiles, and Chelonians from the Malay Peninsula, made by Members of the “Skeat Expedition,” 1899–1900". Proc. Zool. Soc. Lond. 1901 (2): 575-583 + Plate XXXV. (Distira annandalei, new species, pp. 579–580 + Plate XXXV, figures 1 & 2).
Smith MA (1926). Monograph of the Sea Snakes (Hydrophiidae). London: British Museum (Natural History). xvii + 130 pp. (Kolpophis, new genus, p. 106; Kolpophis annandalei, new combination, p. 106).
Smith MA (1943). The Fauna of British India, Ceylon and Burma, Including the Whole of the Indo-Chinese Sub-region. Reptilia and Amphibia. Vol. III.—Serpentes. London: Secretary of State for India. (Taylor and Francis, printers). xii + 583 pp. (Kolpophis annandalei, pp. 467–468).

annandalei
Snakes of Southeast Asia
Reptiles of Brunei
Reptiles of Cambodia
Reptiles of Indonesia
Reptiles of Malaysia
Reptiles of Thailand
Reptiles of Vietnam
Reptiles described in 1901
Taxa named by Frank Fortescue Laidlaw
Taxobox binomials not recognized by IUCN
Reptiles of Borneo